Scott Gilmore is a Canadian social entrepreneur, former Canadian foreign service officer, and writer who is known for founding the non-profit Building Markets and as an advocate for capitalist expansion in the international development and charity sectors.

Early life and education 
Gilmore was born in northern Manitoba, the son of hockey player Tom Gilmore and Collette Gilmore. He is the brother of actor Patrick Gilmore. The family settled in Edmonton, Alberta when his father played for the World Hockey Association version of the Edmonton Oilers. Gilmore obtained a Bachelor of Commerce degree at the University of Alberta, followed by a master's degree in international history from the London School of Economics.

Career 
Gilmore was a Canadian foreign service officer who began his career in Jakarta. From that post he covered the civil war resulting from the Indonesian occupation of East Timor, and later joined the United Nations Transitional Administration in East Timor (UNTAET) peacekeeping mission under Sergio de Mello. In that role he became disillusioned with ineffective donor efforts to fight poverty. Based on this experience he quit his job as a diplomat in 2004 to launch the non-profit Building Markets. and focus on capitalism instead of aid as a sustainable poverty solution.

In 2006 Gilmore led a World Bank study to trace spending in peacekeeping missions that revealed only 5% of donor money entered the local economies. Based on those findings Gilmore launched a project in Afghanistan to channel international spending through local small businesses. This approach was successful and expanded to other countries. Building Market's "buy local" policy was officially adopted by NATO, the United States government, and the United Nations. In 2013 Gilmore was appointed to by the External Advisory Group overseeing the merger of the Canadian Department of Foreign Affairs and International Trade with the Canadian International Development Agency. He had previously been supportive of the merger.

In 2014, Gilmore began writing a weekly column for the Canadian week national newsmagazine Maclean's.

Awards and honours 
Gilmore was named as "Transformational Canadian" by The Globe and Mail and a Young Global Leaders by the World Economic Forum. In 2009 he was awarded the $765,000 dollar Skoll Prize for Social Entrepreneurship by philanthropist Jeff Skoll. The University of Alberta awarded him a Distinguished Alumnus Award in 2013. He received a Queen Elizabeth II Diamond Jubilee Medal for professional excellence.

Personal life 
Gilmore was married to Catherine McKenna, former Liberal MP for Ottawa Centre and former cabinet minister until separating in 2019. They have three children together.

References

External links 
 
 

Year of birth missing (living people)
Social entrepreneurs
Living people
Place of birth missing (living people)
Canadian businesspeople
People from Flin Flon
University of Alberta alumni
Alumni of the London School of Economics